Alfredo Tomás Cenzano Sierralta (born June 9, 1949) is a Peruvian politician and a former Congressman representing Puno for the 2006–2011 congressional term. Cenzano belongs to the Peruvian Aprista Party. He retired from politics in 2011.

External links
Official Congressional Site

Living people
American Popular Revolutionary Alliance politicians
Members of the Congress of the Republic of Peru
1949 births